Henry Ludlow (c. 1577 – 13 October 1639) was an English politician who sat in the House of Commons between 1601 and 1611.

Ludlow was the son of Sir Edmund Ludlow and his first wife Bridget Coker, daughter of Henry Coker of Mappowder, Dorset. He was educated at Hart Hall, Oxford in 1591 and at Middle Temple in 1595. 

In 1601, he was elected Member of Parliament for Andover. He was elected MP for Ludgershall in 1604. A piece of libellous verse "The Censure of the Parliament Fart" was composed in response to an audible emission by Ludlow in parliament in 1607.

Downe came grave auntient Sir John CrookeAnd redd his message in his booke.Fearie well, Quoth Sir William Morris, Soe:But Henry Ludlowes Tayle cry’d Noe.Up starts one fuller of devotionThen Eloquence; and said a very ill motionNot soe neither quoth Sir Henry JenkinThe Motion was good; but for the stinckingWell quoth Sir Henry Poole it was a bold trickeTo Fart in the nose of the bodie politique

In 1624 Ludlow succeeded to the estates of his father.

Ludlow died at the age of about 63. He had married Lettice West, daughter of Thomas West, 2nd Baron De La Warr of Wherwell, Hanpshire and Offington, Sussex and had four sons and five daughters. His stepbrother also Henry was also an MP.

References

1570s births
1639 deaths
Alumni of Hart Hall, Oxford
Henry
Members of the Middle Temple
English MPs 1601
English MPs 1604–1611